Chengdu Tianfu Software Park (TFSP) is located in the Southern Zone of Chengdu Hi-tech Industrial Development Zone (Chengdu Hi-Tech Zone) in Sichuan, China, established in 2005.

The software park has been developed by Chengdu Hi-tech Investment Group Co., Ltd. TFSP has a total planned construction area of over 2.2 million m2. The park is a base for software development and the service outsourcing industry. Chengdu Tianfu Software Park currently consists of four phases.

Phases I and II
Phase I of Tianfu Software Park has a total construction area of about 230,000 m2. The whole project is divided into two sections: zone A and zone B, with nine buildings in the former and eight in the latter. Building A9 accommodates various restaurants and canteens.

Phase II of Tianfu Software Park has a total land use of 760,000 m2 and a total construction area of 560,000 m2. The whole project is divided into two sections: zone C and zone D, with twelve buildings in the former and seven in the latter. Building D1 consists of three distinctive supporting facilities: dormitories, an apartment block, and a business hotel. The underground area of zone D is dedicated to the catering needs of the area with several restaurants, two canteens and a coffee shop. Phase II was delivered in three batches: the first group of buildings in the C zone of a total construction area of 140,000 m2 in June 2008; the second batch in the D zone of a total construction area of 170,000 m2 in July 2009 and the third batch of 250,000 m2 in June 2010.

Phase III
Phase III of Tianfu Software Park has a total construction area of 250,000 m2. This project consists of two buildings and is located along Tianfu Avenue. Phase III is planned for completion at the end of the year 2011.

Phase IV
Phase IV is located in the southern residential area of Chengdu Hi-tech Zone with a total construction area of 1,100,000 m2. Tianfu Village is the latest project launched under the label of Tianfu Software Park and operated by Tianfu Software Park Co., Ltd.

Phase IV was specifically designed to accommodate hi-tech, BPO, e-commerce, and call-center operations, but also provides SOHO offices for smaller businesses.

Location
Tianfu Software Park is located in the south part of Chengdu Hi-tech Zone and in the core area of Chengdu’s new city center, also called Tianfu New City.

The Park is a 25-minutes drive to Tianfu Square (city center), a 10-minute drive to the South Railway Station, and a 15-minute drive to the Shuangliu International Airport.

Asides from many public buses stopping by Tianfu Software Park, the park operator provides 24-hour shuttle buses from the park to the South Railway Station. The first line of the subway system has been operational since October 2010 and will have its terminal station located 100 meters away from the software park.

The journey from the park to Tianfu Square (in the city center) by subway has been reduced to 20 minutes.

Partners
Since Tianfu Software Park was launched in 2005, it has attracted a large number of enterprises segmented in six sectors: ITO/software development, digital entertainment, information security, telecom, R&D, IC design, and BPO/shared services centers. Over 200 companies operate in the park, employing about 30,000 people.

About Chengdu Tianfu Software Park Co., Ltd
Chengdu Tianfu Software Park Co., Ltd, a wholly-owned subsidiary of Chengdu Hi-tech Investment Group, was founded under the leadership of the Administration Committee of Chengdu Hi-tech Zone in February 2009 to operate Tianfu Software Park.

See also
 Chengdu
 Economic and Technological Development Zones
 Sichuan
 Tianfu Art Park

References

External links
Chengdu Tianfu Software Park Official website

2005 establishments in China
Buildings and structures in Chengdu
Economy of Chengdu
Parks in Chengdu
Science parks in China
Information technology in China